Richard Taryn Leong (born in 1973 in Burnaby, British Columbia, Canada) is a Canadian artist working primarily in painting and drawing. He is represented by Parisian Laundry in Montreal.

Education 
Leong obtained his BFA from the University of Victoria. Leong obtained his master's degree in Fine Arts from Concordia University in 2007. His thesis was  acquired by the Montreal Museum of Fine Arts.

Work 
Leong's work focuses on landscapes and the dynamic between the objective and the subjective.

Notable exhibitions include Realities Folies at Open Space, Victoria, British Columbia (2015); Nemophily at Evans Contemporary, Peterborough, Ontario (2014); Sleepwalking Daydreams at Parisian Laundry, Montreal, Quebec (2014); Sublimation of Self at Anna Leonowens Gallery, Halifax, Nova Scotia (2012); Hybrid Vigour at Parisian Laundry, Montreal (2012); The Phenomenology of Dusk at the Art Gallery of Greater Victoria, (2012); Space & Time at Parisian Laundry, Montreal (2011); La terre est bleue comme une orange at the Montreal Museum of Fine Arts (2010); The Third Meaning at RH Gallery, New York (2010); The Wilderness at McClure Gallery, Montreal (2010); I am Nature at Parisian Laundry, Montreal, and La biennale de Montréal, (2009).  In 2008, he was a finalist in the Royal Bank of Canada's Painting Competition, touring at venues such as the National Gallery of Canada, the Power Plant (Toronto), and the Contemporary Art Gallery (Vancouver).

Collections

Leong's work can be found in private and corporate collections including the Canada Council Art Bank, the Canadian Art Foundation, the Musée national des beaux-arts du Québec, as well as the permanent collection at The Montreal Museum of Fine Arts. Other collections include the Aldo Group, Collect' Art, Senvest and Caisse de Depot.

Bibliography 

 Rick Leong: The Wilderness
 Rick Leong and David Six
 BNL MTL 09
 Preview David Six and Rick Leong
 Rick Leong: artist profile
 East Meets West: Painter Rick Leong's work is an enchanted blend of the mythic and visceral
 Rick Leong, Parisian Laundry
 Paintings by Rick Leong
 Ten artists first-time buyers should invest in now

References

1973 births
Living people
20th-century Canadian painters
Canadian male painters
21st-century Canadian painters
Artists from British Columbia
People from Burnaby
University of Victoria alumni
Concordia University alumni
20th-century Canadian male artists
21st-century Canadian male artists